Glenea ochraceovittata is a species of beetle in the family Cerambycidae. It was described by James Thomson in 1865. It is known from Malaysia.

Subspecies
 Glenea ochraceovittata discomedioplagiata Breuning, 1956
 Glenea ochraceovittata elate Pascoe, 1867
 Glenea ochraceovittata ochraceovittata J. Thomson, 1865

References

ochraceovittata
Beetles described in 1865